Ercole Carzino (9 October 1901 – 10 January 1980) was an Italian professional footballer who played as a midfielder.

International career
Carzino made his only appearance for the Italy national football team on 6 November 1921 in a game against Switzerland.

Personal life
Carzino's older brother Enrico Carzino also played football professionally. To distinguish them, Enrico was referred to as Carzino I and Ercole as Carzino II.

Bibliography

External links

 

1901 births
1980 deaths
Italian footballers
Italy international footballers
U.C. Sampdoria players

Association football midfielders
U.S. Imperia 1923 players
People from Sampierdarena